The Girl Next Door is the 10th studio album by Evelyn "Champagne" King. The album was released in September, 1989 by EMI Records.

Track listing
Unless otherwise indicated, Information is based on Liner notes

Personnel
Evelyn “Champagne” King - Background Vocals (2-10), Lead Vocals
Alicia Barlow - Background Vocals (2, 5-6, 10)
Byron Burke - Keyboards, Bass played by (7)
Phaedra Butler - Background Vocals (1)
Tom Carden - Music programming, Drum Machine, Keyboards (1)
Shawn Christopher - Background Vocals (3)
David Cochrane - Background Vocals, All Instruments (4)
Vicky Dewindt-King - Background Vocals (4, 8)
Gene Dozier - Rhythm arranger, Keyboards, Synthesizer, Bass Synth, Drum Machine (6)
Bill Estes - Music programming (8)
Jeff Fargus - Rhythm arranger (5, 10), Music programming (5-6, 10), Keyboards, Synthesizer (2, 5-6, 10), Drum Machine (2, 10), Horns, Bass played by (10), Horn arranger (2, 6), String arranger, Drums (2)
Grand Stuff - Horns played by (3, 7)
Marshall Jefferson - Music arranger, Keyboards, Drums, Bass played by (3)
David Josias - Percussion (3, 7)
Johnny King - Keyboards, Drums, Bass played by, Background Vocals (9)
Herb Lawson - Guitar, Background Vocals (3, 7), Additional Lead Vocals (7)
Fred Leyro - Guitar (9)
Robin Macatangay - Guitar (1, 8)
Bob Mitchell - Music programming (9)
Nayan - Music arranger, Music programming, Drum Machine (1, 8), Keyboards (1)
Keith Nunally - Background Vocals (7)
Dino Pinkney - Guitar (9)
Etienne “ATN” Stadwijk - Music programming (8), Keyboards (1, 8)
Byron Stingily - Background Vocals (3, 7), Additional Lead Vocals (7), Bass Vocals (3)
Charmaine Sylvers - Background Vocals (2, 5-6, 10)
Foster Sylvers - Bass Guitar (5-6)
Leon Sylvers III - Rhythm arranger, Drum Machine, Bass Synth (5), Horn arranger (6)
John Taylor - Guitar (2, 5-6)
Ten City - Music arranger (3)
Ten City Strings - Strings (7)
Margo Thunder - Background Vocals (1)
Earl Young - Drums (7)

References

External links

Evelyn "Champagne" King albums
1989 albums
Albums produced by Leon Sylvers III
EMI America Records albums